"Nobody's Talking" is a song written by Sonny LeMaire and Randy Sharp, and recorded by American country music group Exile. It was released in March 1990 as the second single from their album Still Standing. The song reached number 2 on the Billboard Hot Country Singles & Tracks chart in July 1990.

Music video
The music video was directed by Jim May and premiered in early 1990.

Chart performance

Year-end charts

References

1990 songs
1990 singles
Exile (American band) songs
Songs written by Randy Sharp
Arista Nashville singles
Songs written by Sonny LeMaire